Chénzhuāng could refer to the following locations in China:

Towns
 Chenzhuang, Lingshou County, Hebei
 Chenzhuang, Huantai County, Shandong
 Chenzhuang, Lijin County, Shandong

Townships
 Chenzhuang Township, Xian County, Hebei
 Chenzhuang Township, Biyang County, Henan
 Chenzhuang Township, Fan County, Henan
 Chenzhuang Township, Linying County, Henan

Village
 Chenzhuang, Wanquan in Wanquan, Honghu, Jingzhou, Hubei